Tetidu Rural LLG is a local-level government (LLG) of Manus Province, Papua New Guinea.

Wards
01. Buyang
02. Kawaliap
03. Tingou
04. Londru
05. Pitariat
06. Tawi

References

Local-level governments of Manus Province